Epidendrium is a genus of gastropods belonging to the family Epitoniidae.

The species of this genus are found in Southern Europe, America, Malesia, Australia.

Species:

Epidendrium aureum 
Epidendrium billeeanum 
Epidendrium dendrophylliae 
Epidendrium parvitrochoides 
Epidendrium reticulatum 
Epidendrium sordidum

References

Gastropods